Tai Tong is an area southwest of Shap Pat Heung, in Yuen Long District, in the northwestern part of Hong Kong.

Tai Tong Village or Tai Tong Tsuen is located in the area.

Administration
Tai Tong Tsuen is a recognized village under the New Territories Small House Policy.

Features
Tai Tong is famous for its Lychee mountain. Over there, it has been a prime spot for Hong Kong programs set in the olden times.

There's also an airsoft site located in the area.

Education
Tai Tong Tsuen is in Primary One Admission (POA) School Net 73. Within the school net are multiple aided schools (operated independently but funded with government money) and one government school: South Yuen Long Government Primary School (南元朗官立小學).

See also
 Tai Lam Country Park
 Wong Nai Tun Tsuen
 Yeung Ka Tsuen

References

External links

 Delineation of area of existing village Tai Tong (Shap Pat Heung) for election of resident representative (2019 to 2022)
 "Review of Egretries in Hong Kong", in Hong Kong Biodiversity, Issue No. 14 March 2007, pp. 1-6.
 Antiquities Advisory Board. Historic Building Appraisal. Leung Yin Wo Ancestral Hall, Tai Tong Tsuen Pictures

Yuen Long District
Areas of Hong Kong
Shap Pat Heung